Live Worship may refer to:

 Live Worship: Blessed Be Your Name, an album Rebecca St. James
 Live Worship with Tommy Walker